Shane Battelle (born October 5, 1971)  is a retired American soccer player who played with the Columbus Crew in Major League Soccer.

College
After capping off his senior year at Hazelwood Central High School with a state championship, Missouri Player of the Year honors and being named a Parade Magazine All-American, Battalle spent one season (1990) playing soccer at Southern Methodist University.   He was named to the Soccer America Magazine Freshman All-American Team as one of the best 11 freshman in the entire country that year.  In 1991, he transferred to St. Louis University, where he played for the men's soccer team.  SLU finished the 1991 season ranked second in the nation.  Battelle was team captain his senior year. The Billikens went to the quarterfinals of the NCAA Division I post-season tournament that season, and Battelle was selected as a 1993 first-team All-American.  Battelle was also nominated for the MAC Award and Hermann Trophy as the best player in college soccer but finished behind Claudio Reyna in the voting.  He was inducted to the Saint Louis University Hall of Fame in 1999 with teammate and longtime friend Brian McBride.

Professional
In January 1994, the St. Louis Ambush selected Battelle in the first round of the National Professional Soccer League draft. The Ambush went on to win the NPSL Championship that season. In the summer of 1995, he played for the St. Louis Knights in the USISL In February 1996, the Columbus Crew of Major League Soccer selected Battelle in the 1996 MLS Inaugural Player Draft. Battelle spent one season playing for Columbus, starting at defensive center midfield. A knee injury suffered that season ended his career.

International
In 1990, Battelle played with the United States U-20 National Soccer Team (US U-20) in its bid to qualify for the 1991 FIFA World Youth Championship. Battelle also played with the U.S. National B Team, a group of the best college players in the country who were seen as prospects for the full U.S National Team, from 1992 to 1994. The full National Team, at that time, was composed of only players who had graduated from college. This included a win over Trinidad & Tobago in Trinidad.  He was co-captain of the U.S. at the 1993 World University games along with Claudio Reyna, scoring key goals in wins against Ireland and Australia, and notching two goals and an assist in a victory over Nigeria.  Battelle also played in the 1990 U.S. Olympic Festival, captaining the North team to the gold medal.

References

External links
St. Louis University Player Profile

1972 births
American soccer players
Columbus Crew players
National Professional Soccer League (1984–2001) players
Saint Louis Billikens men's soccer players
SMU Mustangs men's soccer players
St. Louis Ambush (1992–2000) players
St. Louis Knights players
USL Second Division players
Living people
Major League Soccer players
United States men's under-20 international soccer players
All-American men's college soccer players
Association football defenders
Columbus Crew draft picks